Liolaemus brizuelai is a species of lizard in the family  Liolaemidae. The species is endemic to Argentina.

Etymology
The specific name, brizuelai, is in honor of Argentine landowner Pío Brizuela, on whose property the holotype was collected.

Geographic range
L. brizuelai is only known from Catamarca Province in northwestern Argentina.

Habitat
L. brizuelai inhabits a sandy region dominated by Prosopis flexuosa forest. It can be found under fallen trees.

Description
L. brizuelai is a medium-sized member of the genus Liolaemus, reaching  in snout–vent length.

References

brizuelai
Reptiles of Argentina
Endemic fauna of Argentina
Reptiles described in 2021
Taxa named by Cristian Simón Abdala
Taxa named by Andrés Sebastián Quinteros